Santa Maria del Rosario ("Our Lady of the Rosary", also called San Domenico) is a Catholic church in Alcamo, in the province of Trapani.

History 
It was founded in 1660 with the adjoining friary (used for public offices and houses after 1866) by the Dominican Fathers.

Until that year they had resided in another friary next to Santa Maria della Stella, where in 1587 there were eight friars and needed an urgent restoration work. They moved to the town area where today there is the Church of the Rosary, and carried the fresco with the Madonna which is still kept in this Church.

In 1761 the church was rebuilt and enlarged a lot, and finally in 1947 became a parish dedicated to Our Lady of the Rosary

Works 
The interior with a rectangular nave and nine chapels, keeps the following works which are of good artistic value:

 A Cross, painted in the 15th century and placed on the ceiling
 an old painting of Saint Dominic, on the left side after the main entrance
 Saint Peter, martyr, a painting of the 17th century, below it there is a wooden statue of Madonna del Ponte made by Giuseppe Ospedale; in the first left chapel
 Saint Vincent Ferrer a wooden statue probably made in the 18th century; second left chapel
 Our Lady of the Rosary (Madonna del Rosario) with the Mysteries, a painting realized by Vito Carrera in 1603; on the secondary door
 Saint Anthony of Padua a painting by Mario Giambona (1713), coming from the ex church of Itria; third left chapel
 Our Lady of Sorrows, on the wall there is a marble Bas-relief by the school of Gagini, representing Dormitio Virginis; fourth left chapel
In the apse: a beautiful altar with Our Lady of the Rosary and three wooden statues of Our Lady with the Child, Saint Dominic and saint Rosa
 An old painting of saint Catherine: on the right side, past the main entrance
 A Dominican saint kneeling before Our Lady with the Child, made by Bernardo Rizzuti Pauletti from Corleone (1718) in the second room
 Saint Dominic, an old painting probably made in the 18th century; below it there is a wooden statue of saint Expeditus by Domenico Messina; first right chapel
 Santa Maria della Stella ( 1464), a fresco coming from the homonymous church and assigned to Tommaso De Vigilia; even if damaged and faded because of the passing of time, it still has the original expressive force. In the second right chapel
 The Holy Heart of Jesus, a wooden statue; third right chapel
 Elegant altar with a painting of saint Dominic by an unknown author, on the pillars there are 15 oval paintings representing the 15 mysteries of the Rosary realized by Carlo Brunetti in 1759 on behalf of the Company of the Rosary; fourth right chapel.

Inside the sacristy there was an alabaster statue of the Virgin and Child, called Madonna della Provvidenza, dating back to the 15th century and assigned to Pietro de Bonitate (today kept in the Sacred Art Museum in the Mother Church), a painting representing the miracle of saint Vincenzo Ferreri made by Giuseppe Renda in 1793, and another representing saint Angela Merici, made in 1905 by Francesco Alesi.

See also 

 Alcamo
 Catholic Church in Italy
 Domenicani
 San Domenico

References

Bibliography 
 
 
 
 
 
 

Roman Catholic churches in Alcamo